The Russian Civil War (1917–1922) was a multi-party civil war in the former Russian Empire immediately after the two Russian Revolutions of 1917, as many factions vied to determine Russia's political future. 

Civil wars in the Russian Tsardom included:

 Kazan rebellion (1552–1556)
 Time of Troubles (1598–1613)
 Bashkir rebellion (1662–1664)
 Bashkir rebellion (1681–1684)
 Bashkir rebellion (1704–1711)
 Bulavin Rebellion (1707–1708)

Civil wars in the Russian Federation include:

 East Prigorodny Conflict (1989–1992)
 First Chechen War (1994–1996)
 War of Dagestan (1999)
 Second Chechen War (1999–2009)
 Insurgency in the North Caucasus (2009–2017)
 August Coup (August 19–21 1991) 
 Black October (21 September – 4 October 1993)
For ongoing actions against the Russian Government under President Vladimir Putin, see;

 2022 Belarusian and Russian partisan movement

See also
 List of wars involving Russia
 Russo-Ukrainian War (2014–present)